is a Japanese tokusatsu television series. The fourth installment to be produced as part of the Kamen Rider Series, the series aired in Japan from late 1974 to early 1975 on the NET and Mainichi Broadcasting System. It was the shortest Kamen Rider series ever, lasting only 24 episodes. While this was believed to be due to the show's heavy amounts of graphic violence, in reality, this was due to a pre-planned changeover between networks airing the program, from NET to MBS/TBS, which requested a clean break in airing series, thus resulting in a pre-planned end at episode 24. Its timeslot on NET was taken over by Himitsu Sentai Gorenger a week after its finale aired.

Plot summary
A plane crashes in the Amazon rainforest, leaving young Daisuke Yamamoto stranded without his parents. Soon adopted by an Incan tribe under the name "Amazon", he becomes a wild child, living off the land. However, his village is massacred by the Ten-Faced Demon Gorgos, who searches for the powerful GiGi Armlet to take over the world with it. The last Inca, Elder Bago, gives Daisuke the GiGi Armlet for safekeeping and uses his knowledge of Incan science and magic to perform a mystic ritual on Daisuke and transform him into the powerful "Kamen Rider Amazon" before dying. Now in Japan, Daisuke battles the evil organization Gedon, unaware of why they pursue him. Befriending Professor Kousaka's nephew and niece, Daisuke learns of the GiGi Armlet's true nature and ultimately defeats Gedon, then the Garanda Empire.

Characters
 
 : Ally of the original Kamen Riders. Motorbike specialist. He helps Daisuke settle in Japan.
 : The nephew of professor Kōsaka and Daisuke's first friend in Japan, helping him in any way he can. At the end of Episode 12, Masahiko begins teaching Amazon to speak coherent Japanese. Masahiko attends Jonan Elementary School.
 : Masahiko's big sister. At first she doesn't trust Daisuke due to bringing Gedon to Japan and causing chaos. After being constantly rescued and helped by Daisuke she puts her faith and trust in him.
 : A molelike monster, nicknamed "Mogura", able to burrow underground and prone to chanting "chu-chu". The Mole Beastman was originally working for Gedon and was sent after Daisuke only to fall back due to police interference. After getting a chance to redeem himself, The Mole Beastman goes after Masahiko to set a trap for Daisuke which ended up with his arm dislocated and many other injuries before he escaped. As a result, the Mole Beastman gets exiled to the surface and chained up to die of sun stroke. Daisuke, taking pity on the monster, rescues him from his cruel fate. Though confused why, The Mole Beastman becomes Daisuke's recurring ally until Garanda's Tokyo Mold Destruction Operation, where he faked offering his services to Garanda to take mold. However, the Mushroom Beastman expected it and poisoned the Mole Beastman, living long enough to make his way to the doctor, but too late to be saved by the newly developed antidote. Soon after avenging him, Daisuke builds a memorial in the Mole Beastman's honor.
 : The chief of the Incas who bestowed the GiGi Armlet to Daisuke before he died.
 : The Okamura siblings' uncle and Bago's acquaintance. He was killed by Gedon because he knew their secret.

Gedon
 is the evil organization based in the Amazon before moving to Japan, bent on world dominion and fueled by human blood.
 : The leader of Gedon, Gorgos' boulder-like lower body holds many faces. He possesses the GaGa Armlet and wishes to acquire the GiGi Armlet Daisuke possesses in order to achieve his goal of ruling the world with Incan science. After being forced to abandon his base, Gorgos attacks Yurigaoka and starts slaughtering people with his acidic foam until Amazon arrives and battles him until he is forced to fall back when one of his faces is killed. Falling into Dobsonfly Beastman's trap, Gorgos loses his other faces before Daisuke uses his Daisetsudan to rip off his right arm that was wearing the GaGa Armlet, only for one of Garanda's Black Followers to steal it and give it to Emperor Zero, Gorgos explodes into pieces in the sky and Gedon is defeated. 
 : Geddon's female foot soldiers, serving as their eyes and ears.

Garanda Empire
The  makes its appearance prior to Gorgos' death, taking the GaGa Bracelet for their own use as they go on a campaign of terrorist attacks on Tokyo to make it into their seat of power before going after the rest of the world. Led by the mysterious "Ruler" and stationed underground in a trap-filled base, the Garanda Empire also uses Beastmen as their monsters.

 : The true leader of Garanda and Gedon, wearing silvery white robes that hide his true nature. He makes himself known to Amazon when he destroys the Helium Bomb's detonation system, unmasked as the  he fights Amazon in his throne room before being impaled by one of his spears and having both of his arms cut off. He still refuses to go down quietly, forcing Amazon to use Super Daisetsudan to behead him, causing him to explode with Garanda's base destroyed in the process.
 : A Body double who poses for the real Zero, using his lance to execute traitors and failures alike. When Daisuke arrives to Garanda's base, Zero negates the GiGi Armlet's powers with his lance as the Helium Bomb is installed. However, once the GaGa Armlet is fused to the GiGi Armlet, Daisuke become immune to Zero's power as he loses his arm to the Kamen Rider before he gets impaled by his own pit trap.
 : The Garanda Empire's foot soldiers.

List of episodes 
  (Original Airdate: October 19, 1974)
  (Original Airdate: October 26, 1974)
  (Original Airdate: November 2, 1974)
  (Original Airdate: November 9, 1974)
  (Original Airdate: November 16, 1974)
  (Original Airdate: November 23, 1974)
  (Original Airdate: November 30, 1974)
  (Original Airdate: December 7, 1974)
  (Original Airdate: December 14, 1974)
  (Original Airdate: December 21, 1974)
  (Original Airdate: December 28, 1974)
  (Original Airdate: January 4, 1975)
  (Original Airdate: January 11, 1975)
  (Original Airdate: January 18, 1975)
  (Original Airdate: January 25, 1975)
  (Original Airdate: February 1, 1975)
  (Original Airdate: February 8, 1975)
  (Original Airdate: February 15, 1975)
  (Original Airdate: February 22, 1975)
  (Original Airdate: March 1, 1975)
  (Original Airdate: March 8, 1975)
  (Original Airdate: March 15, 1975)
  (Original Airdate: March 22, 1975)
  (Original Airdate: March 29, 1975)

Movie
The Kamen Rider Amazon movie is a theatrical version of episode 16, depicting Gengoro Beastman's attempt to execute Garanda's Tokyo Sea of Flame plan.

S.I.C. Hero Saga
The S.I.C. Hero Saga story for Amazon as published in the May through July 2004 issues of Monthly Hobby Japan magazine is titled .

Chapter titles

Kamen Rider Amazons

To celebrate the 45th anniversary of the Kamen Rider Series, Toei and Amazon.com collaborated on an original Amazon Video series titled , serving as a reimagining of Kamen Rider Amazon in a modern biopunk setting.

Cast
Tōru Okazaki as Daisuke Yamamoto/Amazon
Akiji Kobayashi as Tōbei Tachibana
Yōji Matsuda as Masahiko Okamura
Mariko Matsuoka as Ritsuko Okamura
Ryūji Saikachi as Mogura Beastman/Ten-Faced Demon Gorgos (human rock face) (voice)
Ushio Akashi as Elder Bago
Ritsuo Sawa as Ten-Faced Demon Gorgos (voice)
Hirohisa Nakata as Great Emperor Zero
Osamu Saka as The Ruler of Garanda Empire (voice)
Gorō Naya as the Narrator

Songs
Opening theme

Lyrics: Shotaro Ishinomori
Composition: Shunsuke Kikuchi
Artist: Masato Shimon

Ending theme

Lyrics: Saburō Yatsude
Composition: Shunsuke Kikuchi
Artist: Masato Shimon with the Columbia Yurikago-kai
Episodes: 1-14 (1st Verse); 15-24 (2nd Verse)

References

Amazon
1974 Japanese television series debuts
1975 Japanese television series endings
TV Asahi original programming
1970s Japanese television series
Japanese horror fiction television series